In epidemiology, sporadic is a term used to refer to a disease which occurs only infrequently, haphazardly, irregularly or occasionally from time to time in a few isolated places with no discernible temporal or spatial pattern, as opposed to a recognizable epidemic or endemic pattern. The cases are so few (single or in a cluster) and separated so widely in time and place that there exists little or no connection within them. They also do not show a recognizable common source of infection.

In the United States, tetanus, rabies, and plague are considered examples of sporadic diseases. Although the tetanus-causing bacteria Clostridium tetani is present in the soil everywhere in the United States, tetanus infections are very rare and occur in scattered locations because most individuals have either received vaccinations or clean wounds appropriately. Similarly the country records a few scattered cases of plague each year, generally contracted from rodent animals in rural areas in the western part of the country.In another example, World Health Organization defines malaria to be sporadic when autochthonous cases (i.e. between two individuals in the same place) are too few and scattered to have any appreciable effect on the community.

However, if the conditions are favorable for its spread (pathogenicity, susceptibility of hosts, contact rate of individuals, population density, number of vaccinated or naturally immune individuals, etc.), a sporadic disease may become the starting point of an epidemic. For example, in developed countries, shigellosis (bacillary dysentery) is sporadic, but in overcrowded places with poor sanitation and poor personal hygiene, it may become epidemic. From 1998 to 2000, following years of sporadic occurrence until 1997, South Korea experienced a sudden epidemic of shigellosis among school-going children after the introduction of nationwide meal provisions in schools from 1998. Contaminated school meals were identified as the major source of infection. In another example, the South Asian country of Bangladesh experienced sporadic cases of the Dengue fever, a mosquito-borne disease, from its first outbreak in 1964 until 1999. However, in 2000, the arrival of a Thai/Myanmar strain of the highly pathogenic dengue type 3 virus into the overpopulated and poorly urbanized country (which increases human-mosquito contact) with highly favorable breeding grounds (open water reservoirs used by the poor and accumulation of rainwater) for the vector and very little public awareness gave rise to a sudden epidemic of Dengue with 5551 reported cases that year. The type 3 Dengue virus subsided after 2002 and re-emerged in 2017, once again causing an outbreak in 2019.


Relation with endemic and epidemic diseases
According to molecular epidemiologist Lee Riley, multiple sporadic infections that occur steadily and with no major fluctuation with respect to time and place are referred to as endemic disease. But what is considered a low-level endemic and sporadic in one country can be considered an outbreak (or epidemic) in another. In the same country, an increase in occurrence of one disease with very many sporadic clusters can be considered a seasonal fluctuation of an endemic disease, but the same amount of occurrence for another disease traceable to a single shared source exposure or an infectious agent may be considered an epidemic. Thus, an infectious disease can occur as an epidemic in one setting or population and as sporadic or endemic in another setting or population. Riley claims that most sporadic infections are actually part of unrecognized outbreaks and that what appears to be endemic disease occurrence (from a traditional population-based epidemiology approach) actually consists of multiple small outbreaks (from a molecular epidemiology approach) where seemingly unrelated i.e. sporadic cases are in reality epidemiologically related (belonging to the same genotype of an infecting agent). Riley considers the differentiation of a disease occurrence as endemic or epidemic to be not really meaningful. According to Riley, since most so-called sporadic occurrences of an endemic disease are actually small epidemics, rapid public health interventions against such occurrences can be made in the same way as they are done for recognized acute epidemics (i.e. epidemic in the traditional sense).

Notes and references

Notes

References

Works cited
 

Infectious diseases
Epidemiology